Lineo Mochesane (born 29 July 1984) is a female Lesotho taekwondo athlete.

She won her first international gold medal in the women's finweight division (-47 kg) at the 2003 All-Africa Games.

Mochesan was the flag bearer for Lesotho during the Opening Ceremony of the 2004 Summer Olympics. She competed in the women's 49 kg class in the taekwondo tournament at the Olympics but lost in the first round to Austria's Nevena Lukic.

After the Olympics, Mochesan had limited success. In 2006, she won silver in women's finweight at the World Military Taekwondo Championships in Seoul, South Korea.

External links
 Profile from Sports-Reference

1984 births
Living people
Lesotho female taekwondo practitioners
Taekwondo practitioners at the 2004 Summer Olympics
Olympic taekwondo practitioners of Lesotho
African Games gold medalists for Lesotho
African Games medalists in taekwondo
Competitors at the 2003 All-Africa Games